Asif Shah is a Nepalese TV presenter, director, producer, actor, singer & rapper. He is more popularly known for being music video director and also as a member of Nepalese hip hop group "The Unity".  

G21 Production is Ashif Shah's initiative as an independent AV production house, which he started in 2003. Since then, he has directed more than 200 music videos, more than 100 television commercials, directed a short film "Sonam" on Hiv aids awareness, directed a documentary " USAID Asha Ka Kiranharu", directed a PSA "USAID's 60 years", produced radio spot for " ICRC", has produced and directed multiple social and corporate videos and Recently direct an independent feature-length film "Karkash". Later he joined famous Nepalese hip hop group "The Unity " along with "DA69" & "Aidray". The Unity has won various National Award. Their hits includes "Pahilo Maya" , "Aajha Feri", "Janu cha Aaajhai", "Prem Aani Aago", "Aasha Aajhai"

Career
Shah began his career from Channel Nepal in 2002 as a VJ and producer. During his tenure in Channel Nepal, he produced and presented various music-related programmes. In 2003, he joined Nepal 1 channel as a senior producer and presenter where he produced and presented shows like "Sanga Sangai", "A day out with celebrity", "Puraskar Dus Hajar" and "4U". All these shows have garnered high TRP (Television Rating Points). He has worked in Kantipur Television as well, where he produced and presented "KTV Shop", and also in Image Channel as senior producer and presenter for the show "Image Platform" and "Music of Your Choice". During his tenure in Image Channel, he created promotions for "Music of Your Choice" and "Image Platform". After a long break from television, he joined Nepal Idol Season 2

Discography
Jeevan Sathi
Pahilo Maya (feat. The Unity)
Baato Biraye
Auta Byatha

References

External links
 
 

Living people
21st-century Nepalese male singers
1980 births
Actors from Kathmandu
Nepalese hip hop singers
Nepalese male actors
Nepalese television personalities
Nepalese television people
Nepalese film directors